Alan Stewart may refer to:
Alan Stewart (educator) (1917–2004), New Zealand educator and university administrator
Alan Stewart (footballer) (1922–2004), English footballer
Alan Stewart (ice hockey) (born 1964), retired ice hockey left winger
Alan Stewart (alpine skier), British alpine skier
Alan Carl Stewart (1893–1958), Canadian provincial and federal politician
Alan Stewart (Australian politician) (born 1938), Australian politician
Alan Stewart, 10th Earl of Galloway (1835–1901), British peer and politician
Alan Stewart, 2nd High Steward of Scotland (1140–1204), Scottish crusader
Alan Stewart of Darnley (died 1439), Scottish nobleman involved in the Hundred Years' War
Alan Stewart of Dreghorn (died 1333), Scottish nobleman
Al Stewart (bishop) (born 1959), Anglican bishop in Australia
W. F. Alan Stewart (1885–1956), Canadian farmer, fox rancher and political figure

See also
Al Stewart (disambiguation)
Allan Stewart (disambiguation)